William Arnold Cupolo (January 8, 1924 – December 7, 2005) was a Canadian ice hockey right winger. He played 47 games in the National Hockey League for the Boston Bruins during the 1944–45 season. The rest of his career, which lasted from 1944 to 1955, was spent in various minor leagues.

Playing career
Cupolo was born  in Niagara Falls, Ontario. He began his career at Memorial School and graduated to play minor hockey in the Falls.

In 1941, he was recruited by Stratford, where he won the Junior B title in 1941-42. The following season the team moved up to Major Junior "A" and became known as the Stratford Kroehlers.

The Boston Bruins invited him to their camp in 1943. Cupolo went to enlist in the armed forces, but was diagnosed with tuberculosis and faced a 14-month recovery.

In 1944, he again went to the Bruins training camp, but this time made the team. He had 24 points in 47 games in the 1944-45 season.

After playing in the American Hockey League from 1945 to 1949, Cupolo played he played in the United States and Pacific Coast Leagues, and later Senior "A" hockey in Ontario, before moving on to Italy where he was a player-coach for Milan, and also coached the Italian National Hockey Team.

He returned to Niagara Falls after his career in hockey and resided there until his death in 2005.

Career statistics

Regular season and playoffs

References

External links
 
 Niagara Sports Wall of Fame Bio

1924 births
2005 deaths
Boston Bruins players
Canadian ice hockey right wingers
Fort Worth Rangers players
Hershey Bears players
Ice hockey people from Ontario
Milan-Inter HC players
New Haven Eagles players
New Haven Tomahawks players
Ontario Hockey Association Senior A League (1890–1979) players
Seattle Ironmen players
Sportspeople from Niagara Falls, Ontario
Springfield Indians players
Stratford Kroehlers players
Washington Lions players